Sambaa Kʼe Aerodrome  is located adjacent to Sambaa Kʼe, Northwest Territories, Canada. A new and longer runway was opened November 13, 2014 and cost $11.2 million.

See also
Trout Lake Water Aerodrome

References

Registered aerodromes in the Dehcho Region